A referendum on building a safe operation centre was held in Liechtenstein on 2 October 1977. The proposal was approved by 54.4% of voters.

Results

References

1977 referendums
1977 in Liechtenstein
Referendums in Liechtenstein
October 1977 events in Europe